The North of England Institute of Mining and Mechanical Engineers (NEIMME), commonly known as The Mining Institute, is a British Royal Chartered learned society and membership organisation dedicated to advancing science and technology in the North and promoting the research and preservation of knowledge relating to mining and mechanical engineering. The membership of the Institute is elected on the basis of their academic and professional achievements with Members and Fellows entitled to the postnominal MNEIMME and FNEIMME. The Institutes’ membership is predominantly from local industry and from academics at Durham and Newcastle Universities, though members are also located further afield across the UK.

The Institute was founded in 1852 in Newcastle upon Tyne, and was granted a Royal Charter by Queen Victoria in 1876. The Institute developed one of the largest collections of mining information in the world. Its library, named after the first President Nicholas Wood contains more than twenty thousand volumes of technical literature, in the fields of mining, geology, mechanical engineering, government blue books, mine rescue, mineralogy, mineral chemistry, mining statistics, mining law, seismology and other related topics.

In 2019 the assets of the Institute – building, library and archive collections and staff – were transferred to a separate charity, The Common Room of the Great North, established to "celebrate the region's engineering history through education and engagement, with a vision to inspire the next generation of innovators and engineers". Neville Hall, the Institute building, was closed for refurbishment in 2019.

The Institute itself continues as an independent professional membership organisation for engineers, and is currently developing a new strategy that aims to increase its activities.

History

Origins and Formation

The origins of the Institute stem from William Turner, minister of the Hanover Square Chapel, just behind the position of Newcastle railway station. He began Newcastle's first Sunday School, 'a focus of light and learning' for the town. One of his students, John Buddle, became a viewer (mining engineer) and wealthy mine owner, and member of the Literary and Philosophical Society and the Natural History Society of Northumberland, Durham and Newcastle upon Tyne (now the Natural History Society of Northumbria). Buddle became a major influence on the Durham and Northumberland Coalfield, "the King of the Coal Trade". In 1816, Buddle devised a system of diverting underground ventilating currents that is in use today. He did not live to see the impact of his legacy, as he died in 1843, nine years before the founding of the Institute. His papers and 'place books' were deposited at the institute.

Following an explosion at Felling in 1812, the Sunderland Society was set up to improve safety where gas was present in mines. The committee secured the services of Sir Humphry Davy, inventor of the safety lamp, in 1815. Despite changes, explosions continued, culminating in a devastating explosion at St Hilda Colliery in which 52 persons were killed. The South Shields Committee recommended the introduction of government inspections of mines the education of mechanical engineers, leading to the first Government Inspection Act of 1850. A coroner's court held at the Mill Inn at Seaham in 1852 suggested it would be advantageous to form a society to consider the prevention of accidents in coal mines.

At a meeting of “colliery owners, viewers, and others interested in the Coal Trade” on 3 July 1852, it was proposed to form a society to discuss the ventilation of coalmines, prevention of accidents and other items connected with the general working of coalmines. It was to be called "The North of England Society for the Prevention of Accidents and for other purposes connected with mining", and Nicholas Wood would be chairman.  The title actually adopted was the North of England Institute of Mining Engineers, changed in 1870 to North of England Institute of Mining and Mechanical Engineers. A committee was appointed to draw up rules and the inaugural meeting was held on 3 September 1852 at which Wood delivered the inaugural address at the lecture theatre of the Literary and Philosophical Society. In this address he gave the aims of the Institute:

Wood was president from the Institute's inauguration in 1852 until 19 December 1865 when he died aged 70.

A Royal Charter was awarded by Queen Victoria incorporating the Institute in the 28th of November 1876.

A School of Medicine founded in 1834, a predecessor of Newcastle University, occupied the site the Institute was built on. It was in this building part of the 1838 British Association meeting was held. The College of Physical Science in Newcastle, linked to Durham University, was founded in 1871 following some years of discussion and promotion by the Institute. Its classes were taught in the Institute's lecture theatre. It was renamed Armstrong College and was for many decades part of the University of Durham, later to become Kings College and then Newcastle University.

Similar institutions to the Institute were set up in other parts of Britain and informal collaboration led to the creation in 1889 of the Federated Institution of Mining Engineers, comprising NEIMME; Chesterfield and Midland Counties Institution of Engineers; Midland Institute of Mining, Civil and Mechanical Engineers; South Staffordshire and East Worcestershire Institute of Mining Engineers and later the North Staffordshire Institute of Mining and Mechanical Engineers, the Mining Institute of Scotland and the Manchester Geological and Mining Society. The name was changed to the Institution of Mining Engineers in 1898. The constituent societies kept their identity within the national Institution and many, like NEIMME, exist today as local societies of the Institute of Materials, Minerals and Mining.

20th Century
Historically the Institute was concerned not just with measures to reduce accidents, but with the theory, art and practice of mining in general. So through meetings, presentation, discussion and publication of research papers, investigations, experimental work, and so on, the Institute tried to fulfil these aims. Working groups were set up, for example on tail ropes; flameless explosives; mechanical ventilators and mechanical coal cutting.  There were research committees on such as strata control, set up in 1924 and safety in mines reporting, for example on horse haulage. In the 1900s there was also collaboration with Armstrong/Kings College in areas such as ventilation and mine lighting. The Institute also worked with National Coal Board committees such as the Divisional Strata Control Research Committee.

The Common Room of the Great North

During the later 20th Century NEIMME's role and importance declined as the coal industry changed and shrank in size. Its finances became precarious and by the beginning of the 21st Century its continued existence was in doubt. A working group of the Institute concluded that a widening of its role was needed and suggested it used its heritage and collections as a basis for a programme of training, conference, debates, etc about the future engineering, cultural, infrastructure and so on of the North East. A working title for the new body was the Great North Institute. Heritage Lottery grants enabled the development of the ideas and the creation of a new charity and limited company now named The Common Room of the Great North. Neville Hall and the NEIMME Library collections - books, journals, reports, maps, photographs, archives, etc - all legally transferred to The Common Room on 1 March 2019. Most of the material is in store until Neville Hall reopens in Autumn 2020 after refurbishment. There is a continuing digitisation programme of archives and other resources in the collection and a process to provide online access to digitised material is being developed.

Currently The Common Room has an exhibition, Graft and Glory, that explores the North East’s industrial heritage and is touring various venues in the region from the Tweed to the Tees. It is associated with a public programme of family activities, public lectures, oral history workshops and community engagement.

Institute building

In early years meetings of the Institute were held in the Literary and Philosophical Society and other local premises, but the need for its own building became apparent. Robert Stephenson, son of George Stephenson, a colleague and contemporary of Nicholas Wood, was his pupil at Killingworth Colliery and when Robert Stephenson died in October 1859 he left £2000 to the Institute which started a fund to build its permanent home. In 1867 plans were made and the building constructed in 1869-72 in Grainger's new town on the site of the medical school on land traditionally held by the Dukes of Westmorland, the Nevilles. It comprises the Wood Memorial Hall containing the Library, lecture theatre and other small rooms and Neville Hall which was primarily office space that from the beginning until recently was let to various mining and other organisations, such as the Coal Trade Association, Blyth and Tyne Railway, Freemasons and the Law Society.

The architect was Archibald Matthias Dunn, whose father, mining engineer and Mines Inspector Matthias Dunn, had been present at the Institute's inaugural meeting. It was built at the height of the English Gothic Revival and shows a mixture of gothic and Tyneside Classical themes. The Library has high windows and a sky lit barrel-vaulted ceiling - the highest point 39 ft above the floor - with stained glass windows by Cooke of London. It includes a monumental statue of Nicholas Wood mounted on a throne in the setting of an iconstasis. There are other works of art including marble busts of John Buddle and Thomas Forster, the Institute's second president and a carving of the River God Tyne including the Institute motto Moneo et munio - I advise and I protect. The original lecture theatre was replaced by the current one in 1902 designed by local architects Cackett and Burns Dick, and modelled on that at the Royal Institution in London. It features a steep rake of seating constructed from Cuban mahogany and the walls display portraits of all the Institute's Presidents since 1852.

Activities

Membership and Postnominals
The Institute is a Royal Chartered membership organisation with members drawn from local industry and academia. The Institute has particularly good links with Durham and Newcastle Universities and with the local geotechnical industry. The Institutes' higher membership grades are judged upon academic and professional achievements, with unqualified but interested members of the public able to join in the lower category. The membership grades are:
 Student
 Affiliate
 Associate
 Member (MNEIMME)
 Fellow (FNIEMME)

Professional and Public Lectures
The Institute has a monthly series of public lectures public lectures on developments in science and technology. These lectures range in topic from current and historical mining projects, active industrial developments with speakers from manufacturing industries, and research talks given by local PhD students. The Institutes' Younger Members Group arranges lectures and events for under-35s.

The Institute also arranges field trips to sites of geological and industrial interest for its members. Many of the Institutes' members have conducted research into the North Pennine Orefield with trips to mines and geological outcrops recorded in its Transactions since the late 1800s to the present day.

Partnerships with other Organisations
The Institute works with other learned and professional organisations to provide its members and the wider public with lectures and events across a range of disciplines. The Institute is a 'local society' of the IOM3 and runs events promoting the study and research of materials science. The Institute holds an annual joint-lecture with the Geological Society of London on strategic geological topics, and has had links with the Society dating back to the 1800s when the British Association meeting was held in Newcastle. The Institute also holds joint events with the Mineralogical Society of Great Britain and Ireland on applied mineralogy and petrology subjects, with the Stephenson Locomotive Society on industrial heritage and transport topics, as well as the Institute of Corrosion, and Institution of Civil Engineers.

Library collections and Publishing
The collections include books, statistical compendia, Mines Inspectors reports, journals, Government committee reports, archives, tracts, maps, photographs, technical reports, artworks and there is a searchable catalogue. In recent years library material has been transferred to the Institute following the closure of institutions such as the NCB Coal Research Establishment at Stoke Orchard, the NCB Mining Research and Development Establishment at Bretby, the British Coal Utilisation Research Association and the Centre for Lifelong Learning at the University of Newcastle.

The Institute regularly publishes articles in its online Transactions on topics ranging from mining engineering and industrial heritage, to materials science and industrial policy.

Governance

The Institute is governed by a Council - as dictated by the Royal Charter - comprising the President, two Vice Presidents, the Honorary Secretary, the Honorary Treasurer, the immediate fifteen Past Presidents, and members elected from the membership. The current Council is composed of professional mining engineers and coal miners from the North East collieries as well as representatives from the local geotechnical industry, academics from Durham University, industrial historians, and active exploration geologists.

Other uses of the building
In recent years the main hall of the Institute has also been used as a 100-capacity music venue, predominantly by local bands. The space has been described as "brilliantly atmospheric", and "an intimate setting for live music". The Mining Institute has also been used as a venue for Home Gathering Festival and is also available for conferences and weddings.
The Institute building was closed for refurbishment but reopened in July 2021.

Gallery

Notable members

William George Armstrong (1810–1900)
Sir Lowthian Bell (1816–1904)
Henry Bolckow (1806-1878)
Edward Fenwick Boyd (1810–1889)
Thomas Douglas (1829-1920)
Matthias Dunn (1788-1869)
George Elliot (1814–1893)
Thomas Emerson Forster (1802–1875)
Robert Galloway (1844–1908)
George Clementson Greenwell (1821–1900)
Thomas Young Hall (1802-1870)
Henry Richard Hancock (1836–1919)
Andrew Leslie (1818-1894)
John Marley (1823–1891)
George May (1839-1915)
Charles Merz (1874-1940)
Charles Mitchell (1820-1895)
Charles Palmer (1822-1907)
Charles Parsons (1854-1931)
Sir Richard Redmayne (1865-1955)
John Wigham Richardson (1837-1908)
Addison Langhorne Steavenson (1836-1913)
Robert Stephenson (1803–1859)
Nicholas Wood (1795–1865)

References

Main sources

Harding, J.T. A history of the North of England Institute of Mining and Mechanical Engineers Mining Engineer 146 1986, 252–6
Harding, J.T. A short history of the Institution of Mining Engineers' North of England Branch and the North of England Institute of Mining and Mechanical Engineers Mining engineer 148 1988-9, 356-358
North of England Institute of Mining and Mechanical Engineers Centenary brochure, 1852-1952. 1952
North of England Institute of Mining and Mechanical Engineers The Mining Institute Renaissance - Anniversary Celebrations 1852–2002. 2002. 
Wood, Sir L. Address [for NEIMME Jubilee] Transactions - North of England Institute of Mining and Mechanical Engineers 52 1902-03, 66-77; Transactions - Institution of Mining Engineers 24 1902-03, 68-79

Regional and local learned societies of the United Kingdom
Science and technology in the United Kingdom
Organisations based in Tyne and Wear
Mining organizations
Buildings and structures in Newcastle upon Tyne
1852 establishments in England
Organizations established in 1852
Mining in Tyne and Wear
Music venues in Tyne and Wear